Gonzalo Garavano (born 26 November 1982 in Buenos Aires) is an Argentine football forward who plays for Sarmiento de Resistencia.

He has played for Olmedo in the Ecuadorian Serie A.
Garavano has played for Estrela da Amadora in Portugal. Garavano had a spell in the lower leagues of Italian football with U.S. Ragusa and U.S. Paolana. He has also played for Alianza F.C. in El Salvador, AC Mineros de Guayana in Venezuela, Coquimbo Unido in Chile, Nacional Potosi in Bolivia, and Perlis FA in the Malaysia Premier League.

References

External links
 

1982 births
Living people
Argentine footballers
Association football midfielders
Footballers from Buenos Aires
Rampla Juniors players
Portimonense S.C. players
Deportivo Italia players
Orihuela CF players
Coquimbo Unido footballers
Perlis FA players
Sarmiento de Resistencia footballers
Chilean Primera División players
Primeira Liga players
Segunda Divisão players
Segunda División B players
Ecuadorian Serie A players
Bolivian Primera División players
Torneo Federal A players
Expatriate footballers in Chile
Expatriate footballers in Spain
Expatriate footballers in Bolivia
Expatriate footballers in Ecuador
Expatriate footballers in Uruguay
Expatriate footballers in Portugal
Expatriate footballers in Venezuela